Gazestan may refer to:
 Gazestan, Chaharmahal and Bakhtiari
 Gazestan, Isfahan
 Gazestan, Kerman
 Gazestan, Kharanaq, Ardakan County, Yazd Province
 Gazestan, Bafq, Yazd Province